Perseverance Creek Dam (also known as Perseverance Dam) is a reservoir in Crows Nest, Toowoomba Region, Queensland, Australia. It creates Lake Perseverance which is the second largest (in terms of storage capacity) and the second oldest reservoir of Toowoomba city's three water supply dams. The other two storages used for Toowoomba are Cooby Dam and Cressbrook Dam which is located downstream of Perseverance.

History 
Construction of this dam commenced in 1962 and was completed in 1965. Perseverance dam is located approximately 35 km Northeast of Toowoomba on Perseverance Creek, which is a tributary of Cressbrook Creek.

On 4 February 1985 a Royal Australian Air Force Chinook helicopter crashed into the dam after striking a power line. The helicopter's pilot was killed, and the other three crew members were injured.

Amenities 
The dam has a lookout with views across the lake, picnic and barbeque facilities, playground, toilets, and walking tracks. Pets are not allowed. Water skiing and canoeing are possible through the Lake Perseverance Centre's activities program.

See also

List of dams and reservoirs in Australia

References

Reservoirs in Queensland
Dams completed in 1965
Darling Downs
Dams in Queensland